Tamás Horváth (born 18 June 1987, is a Hungarian goalkeeper who plays for III. Kerületi TVE.

References

Horváth Tamás Mezőkövesden folytatja kölcsönben‚ vidi.hu, 15 January 2016

External links
 Player profile at HLSZ 
 

1987 births
Living people
People from Veszprém
Hungarian footballers
Association football goalkeepers
Újpest FC players
Százhalombattai LK footballers
Mezőkövesdi SE footballers
Fehérvár FC players
Puskás Akadémia FC players
Győri ETO FC players
FC Ajka players
III. Kerületi TUE footballers
Nemzeti Bajnokság I players
Nemzeti Bajnokság II players
Sportspeople from Veszprém County
21st-century Hungarian people